Murru Prison was an Estonian prison. It was located in Rummu, Harju County.

The prison was established in 1938. Until 1970s, at the prison there operated stone industry. Industry's workers were mainly prisoners.

In 1961, part of Murru prison was changed to an autonomous prison called Rummu Prison. Rummu Prison existed until 2000.

2011 Harku Prison was merged to Murru Prison (Harku and Murru Prison).

2016 Harku and Murru Prison was merged to Tallinn Prison. Prisoners were transported to Tallinn, Tartu and Viru Prison.

References

Prisons in Estonia
Lääne-Harju Parish